Shiva Boloorian (born October 6, 1979) is an Iranian playwright, actress, and both a film and theatre director, as well as a television presenter.

Career
Shiva Boloorian has starred in 21 Movies, 29 TV-series and 32 theatre performances. She has also produced and directed 3 short films and over 10 theatre performances.

Film

TV series

Television Film

Theatre

Television Play

Television Presenter

Awards

See also 
 Iranian women
 List of famous Persian women
 Cinema of Iran
List of Iranian artists
Persian theatre

References

External links
"The statement of the stoned women" on Iranian Theatre Web Site
Shiva's weblog 

Official Website since 2001

Iranian television actresses
Iranian stage actresses
Iranian film directors
Iranian theatre directors
Living people
Iranian expatriates in Austria
Year of birth missing (living people)